Marjan is a Dutch and Iranian version of the feminine given name Marianne. The Iranian feminine given name also means "coral" (:wikt:مرجان).

Marjan is also a Macedonian, Slovene, Croatian and Serbian version of the masculine given name Marius.

People with this name include:

Feminine name
Marjan (singer) (born 1948), Iranian singer and actress
Marjan Ackermans-Thomas (born 1942), Dutch pentathlete
Marjan Borsjes (born 1957), Dutch photographer
Marjan Davari (born 1966), imprisoned Iranian researcher, translator and writer 
Marjan Haydaree, Afghan footballer
Marjan Jahangiri (born 1962) British professor of cardiac surgery 
Marjan Janus (born 1952), Dutch swimmer
Marjan Jonkman (born 1994), Dutch fashion model
Marjan Kalhor (born 1988), Iranian alpine skier
Marjan Kamali, Iranian-born writer, author of The Stationery Shop and Together Tea.
Marjan al-Katib al-Islami (fl. 1670), Iranian calligrapher
Marjan Mashkour (born c.1970), Iranian zooarchaeologist
Marjan Nazghlich (1974–2015), Iranian Governor of Golestan Province
Marjan Olyslager (born 1962), Dutch sprinter
Marjan Oudeman (born 1958), Dutch business executive, President of Utrecht University
Marjan Ridder (born 1953), Dutch badminton player
Marjan Salahshouri (born 1996), Iranian taekwondo practitioner
Marjan Sax (born 1947), Dutch feminist activist
Marjan Schwegman (born 1951), Dutch historian
Marjan Shaki (born 1980), German-Iranian musical performer
Marjan Smit (born 1975), Dutch softball player
Marjan Unger (1946–2018), Dutch art historian
Marjan Vahdat (born 1970s), Iranian singer
Marjan op den Velde (born 1971), Dutch water polo player

Masculine name
Marjan Altiparmakovski (born 1991), Macedonian footballer
Marjan Amalietti (1923–1988), Slovene architect
Marjan Belčev (born 1982), Macedonian footballer
Marjan Bojadziev (born 1967), Macedonian economist
Marjan Čakarun (born 1990), Croatian basketball player
Marjan Dema (born 1957), Kosovan mathematician
Marjan Eid (born 1979), Bahraini football manager
Marjan Faleel (born 1962), Sri Lankan politician
Marjan Fuks (1884–1935), Polish photographer, photojournalist and film-maker
Marjan Gerasimovski (born 1974), Macedonian footballer
Marjan Gjurov (born 1980), Macedonian basketball player
Marjan Gorenc (born 1964), Slovenian ice hockey player
Marjan Ilievski (born 1975), Macedonian basketball player
Marjan Janeski (born 1988), Macedonian basketball player
Marjan Jelenko (born 1991), Slovenian Nordic skier
Marjan Jugović (born 1983), Serbian footballer
Marjan Kandus (born 1932), Slovenian basketball player
Marjan Keršič (1920–2003), Slovenian sculptor and mountaineer
Marjan Kolev (born 1977), Macedonian handball player
Marjan Kovačević (born 1957), Serbian chess problemist
Marjan Kozina (1907–1966), Slovene composer
Marjan Lazovski (born 1962), Macedonian basketball player
Marjan Manček (born 1948), Slovene illustrator, cartoonist and animator
Marjan Marković (born 1981), Serbian footballer
Marjan Mijajlović (born 1972), Bosnian sports commentator
Marjan Mijić (born 1978), Serbian singer
Marjan Mladenović (born 1987), Macedonian basketball player
Marjan Mrmić (born 1965), Croatian football goalkeeper
Marjan Mozetich (born 1948), Slovenian-Canadian composer
Marjan Pejoski (born 1968), Macedonian fashion designer 
Marjan Pengov (born 1913), Yugoslav fencer
Marjan Petković (born 1979), German footballer
Marjan Radeski (born 1995), Macedonian footballer
Marjan Rožanc (1930–1990), Slovenian author, playwright, and journalist
Marjan Šarec (born 1977), Slovenian politician and actor, Prime Minister of Slovenia since 2018
Marjan Sekulovski (born 1973), Macedonian football coach
Marjan Šemrl (born 1954), Slovenian correspondence chess grandmaster
Marjan Šetinc (born 1949), Slovenian politician
Marjan Srbinovski (born 1974), Macedonian basketball coach
Marjan Stojkovski (born 1965), Macedonian footballer
Marjan Strojan (born 1949), Slovene poet, journalist and translator
Marjan Štrukelj (born 1964), Slovenian slalom canoer
Marjan Zaninović (1911–1968),  Croatian rower
Marjan Žbontar (born 1954), Slovenian ice hockey goaltender
Marjan Živković (born 1973), Serbian football coach

See also
Marjan (disambiguation)
Marian (given name)
Marijan, cognate Croatian name
Marjanović
Marja (name), Finnish and Dutch feminine given name
Marjana, Slavic feminine given name

Dutch feminine given names
Iranian feminine given names
Macedonian masculine given names
Pakistani feminine given names
Serbian masculine given names
Slovene masculine given names